The ARIA Singles Chart ranks the best-performing singles in Australia. Its data, published by the Australian Recording Industry Association, is based collectively on the weekly physical and digital sales and streams of singles. In 2019, 10 songs reached number one, with "Dance Monkey" by Tones and I the longest-running. Six acts, Swae Lee, Jonas Brothers, Billie Eilish, Lil Nas X, Shawn Mendes and Tones and I, reached the top spot for the first time. With 10 weeks atop the chart, Tones and I's song "Dance Monkey" broke the record for the most weeks at number one by an Australian artist, which was previously held by Justice Crew's 2014 song "Que Sera". In November, the song reached 16 weeks at number one, breaking the record for most weeks at number one in Australian chart history, previous held by Ed Sheeran's "Shape of You" (2017). It spent 21 weeks atop the chart.

Chart history

Number-one artists

See also
2019 in music
List of number-one albums of 2019 (Australia)
List of top 10 singles in 2019 (Australia)

References

Australia singles
Number-one singles
2019